The Hospital Universitario de Caracas or University Hospital of Caracas (also named Hospital Clínico Universitario or just El Clínico) is a publicly owned hospital located in the spaces of the Ciudad Universitaria de Caracas, part of the Central University of Venezuela, located in the Chaguaramos parish of Libertador Municipality in the District Capital of Venezuela and west of Caracas Metropolitan District and the city of Caracas, the north central Venezuela.

The idea of creating this institution arose in the year 1943  on the initiative of General Eleazar López Contreras  who in the same year ordered start work with the design of the architect Carlos Raúl Villanueva. It was completed in 1954  and opened in the year 1956 under the dictatorship of General Marcos Perez Jimenez .

As part of the Central University of Venezuela its structure is World Heritage Site since 2000.  It is accessible through the line 3 station of the Caracas Metro Ciudad Universitaria.

See also
List of hospitals in Venezuela

References

External links

Hospital buildings completed in 1954
Hospitals in Venezuela
Hospitals established in 1956
Buildings and structures in Caracas
1954 establishments in Venezuela
Central University of Venezuela
Ciudad Universitaria de Caracas